Short Creek may mean:
 Short Creek (Iowa River), a stream in Iowa
 Short Creek (Bean Lake), a stream in Missouri
 Short Creek (Tennessee River), a stream in Tennessee
 Short Creek, a tributary of the Ohio River
 Short Creek, a tributary of the Souris River
 Short Creek, West Virginia
 Short Creek Township, Harrison County, Ohio
 Short Creek, Arizona, now known as Colorado City, Arizona
 the Short Creek Community, residing in Colorado City, Arizona and Hildale, Utah, which after 1953 fractured into several Mormon fundamentalist groups
 the Short Creek raid, a 1953 Arizona state police and Arizona National Guard action against Mormon fundamentalists in the Short Creek Community